Andriani (born 9 April 1995) is an Indonesian woman cricketer. She was also the part of the Indonesian women's national cricket team which emerged as runners-up to Thailand in the women's tournament at the 2017 Southeast Asian Games. She topscored for Indonesia with a knock of 46 in the low scoring final where Indonesia was bowled out for just 86 while chasing a target of 110 runs.

She also represented West Java province at the 2016 Indonesian National Games and performed really well in the National Games.

References 

1995 births
Living people
Indonesian women cricketers
Indonesia women Twenty20 International cricketers
Southeast Asian Games silver medalists for Indonesia
Southeast Asian Games medalists in cricket
Competitors at the 2017 Southeast Asian Games
21st-century Indonesian women